Karosta is a former Russian Imperial and Soviet naval base on the Baltic Sea, which today is a neighbourhood in Liepāja, Latvia.

History 
The naval base was originally constructed in 1890-1906 for Tsar Alexander III of Russia, and named Порт Императора Александра III. Built on the bare coast it consisted of a large man-made harbour including a large breakwater and inland submarine base.

During Lavian independence after World War I, the base was called Kara osta (War Port in Latvian), later shortened to Karaosta and Karosta (Кароста in Russian).

It was a closed military area and army town during the Soviet period, serving as a base for the Soviet Baltic Fleet. It was inaccessible to the civilians of neighbouring Liepāja.

When the Soviet Union army left Latvia in 1994 after the restoration of Latvian independence, Karosta became largely uninhabited and most structures fell to ruin. In late 1990s, the area was troubled by high unemployment, street crime and drug problems. It is today a neighbourhood in the northern outskirts of Liepāja in Latvia, occupying a third of the area of the city.

Today 
Today, Karosta is a popular place for tourists and artists, who are attracted to its historical sights, such as the scenic seascapes with partially blasted fortresses on the Baltic shore. The K@2 Artists center was established in 2000 and acts as a frame for many cultural activities by local and foreign artists who come to Karosta for art projects and to get inspiration from Karosta’s nature, buildings, ruins, and people.

The army headquarters include czar-era mansions used by admirals, a palace for the czar (reportedly only used once), an impressive Russian Orthodox Naval Cathedral, as well as underground bunkers and abandoned storehouses. Soviet-era buildings include many rows of block housing. At its height Karosta was home to over 20,000 people.

Karosta military prison has now been converted into a museum (open May - September) and it is possible to spend the night in the guardhouse, processed as a prisoner would have been.

Gallery

In culture

In 2008 Ivory Tower Pictures produced a television documentary called Karosta: Life After the USSR directed by Peter King.

References

External links

 Ivory Tower Pictures - Producers of Karosta: Life After the USSR (web archive)
 Official site (web archive)
 Images of old fort
 Official Latvian Tourism Portal
 Karosta Prison

Installations of the Russian Navy
Installations of the Soviet Navy
Neighbourhoods in Liepāja